Nezamabad (also Romanized as Nez̧āmābād) is a village in Khesht Rural District, Khesht District, Kazerun County, Fars Province, Iran. At the 2006 census, its population was 291, in 63 families.

References 

Populated places in Kazerun County